Isaac Gervais (1680-1756) was an Anglican priest in Ireland during the 18th century.

Gervais was educated at Trinity College, Dublin. He was Dean of Tuam from 1743 until his death.

References

Alumni of Trinity College Dublin
Deans of Tuam
18th-century Irish Anglican priests
1756 deaths
1680 births